Agnes Browne is a 1999 Irish romantic comedy-drama film directed, produced by, and starring Anjelica Huston, based on the book The Mammy by Brendan O'Carroll.

Plot
In 1967 in Dublin, the unexpected death of Agnes Browne's husband sends her family, consisting of seven children aged between two and fourteen, into emotional turmoil and financial crisis. She is forced to borrow money from a ruthless loan shark named Mr. Billy to make ends meet. Agnes faces her dismal existence by selling fruits and vegetables at an open-air market based in Dublin's Moore Street where she spends time with her best friend Marion, who proves to be a great source of encouragement in her difficulties.

Wishing to escape her troubles, if only for a short time, Agnes dreams of finding enough money to attend an upcoming Tom Jones concert. Agnes' dream is realized when Marion secretly buys two tickets and gives them to her. Agnes also accepts the offer of a date with a French baker named Pierre, and her children pool their money together and buy her a new dress to wear on the date. Meanwhile, Marion soon discovers an ominous lump in her breast, which proves to be malignant.

Eventually the family has to face the loan shark. Mr. Billy warns Agnes that she has until Christmas to pay him back or he will strip her house of her furniture. On Christmas Day, Agnes receives a letter stating she can collect the money from the hotel where her husband worked. She holds off Mr. Billy and sends her children to the hotel, where they meet Tom Jones and tell him their story. Tom then visits Agnes in her home, helps her pay off Mr. Billy, and takes her, her children and their dog to his concert, where Jones dedicates his song "She's a Lady" to Agnes.

Cast
 Anjelica Huston as Agnes Browne
 Marion O'Dwyer as Marion Monks
 Ray Winstone as Mr. Billy
 Arno Chevrier as Pierre
 Niall O'Shea as Mark Browne
 Ciaran Owens as Frankie Browne
 Roxanna Williams as Cathy Browne
 Carl Power as Simon Browne
 Mark Power as Dermot Browne
 Gareth O'Connor as Rory Browne
 James Lappin as Trevor Browne
 Tom Jones as himself (stunt double: Will Anderson)
 Gerard McSorley as Mr. Aherne
 Kate O'Toole as Senior Sister Magdalen
 June Rodgers as Fat Annie
 Jennifer Gibney as Winnie the Mackerel
 Steve Mount as Tommo Monks
 Brendan O'Carroll as Seamus the Drunk
 Doreen Keogh as Mortuary Nun

Reception
Agnes Browne was not well-received in the United States. Franz Lidz, writing in The New York Times, called it a "flimsy whimsy" and chided Roger Ebert for liking it. William Arnold felt that the ending trivialized the story, leaving the audience "with the uncomfortable feeling that we've just viewed some episode of a TV sitcom of the era." The New York Times reviewer Stephen Holden found it "nothing more than a series of homey skits loosely woven into a portrait of a working-class saint."

The film had a better reception in Europe, winning the Youth Jury Award at the 1999 San Sebastián International Film Festival. It also received a Grand Prix nomination at the Ghent International Film Festival the same year.

Legacy
The Mammy was followed by two additional books: The Chiselers and The Granny. A book about Agnes Brown's early life, The Young Wan, was published later. However, these were not made into films. Brendan O'Carroll has had his own success with the Brown family in Mrs. Brown's Boys, both on the theatre stage and on television.

References

External links
 
 
 

1999 films
1999 romantic comedy-drama films
1999 independent films
American romantic comedy-drama films
Irish romantic comedy-drama films
1990s English-language films
1990s French-language films
Films based on Irish novels
Films set in Ireland
Films set in Dublin (city)
Films set in the 1960s
American independent films
Films directed by Anjelica Huston
1999 multilingual films
American multilingual films
Irish multilingual films
Films about parenting
Films about widowhood
1990s American films